Putaqa (Quechua for Rumex peruanus, also spelled Putaca) is a mountain in Peru which reaches a height of approximately . It is located in the Junín Region, Yauli Province, Marcapomacocha District. A small lake named Aququcha (Quechua for "sand lake") lies at its feet.

References

Mountains of Peru
Mountains of Junín Region